Tisch may refer to:

Tisch School of the Arts at New York University
Jonathan M. Tisch College of Citizenship and Public Service at Tufts University
Tisch Library, the main library of Tufts University
Tisch, a novel by Stephen Dixon

People
Tisch family of American businesspeople
Andrew Tisch, son of Laurence Tisch; co-chair of Loews Corporation
James S. Tisch (born 1953), son of Laurence Tisch; CEO of Loews Corporation
Jamie Tisch, wife of Steve Tisch
Joan Tisch, widow of Preston Robert Tisch
Jonathan Tisch (born 1953), son of Preston Robert Tisch; chairman and CEO of Loews Hotels
Merryl Tisch, Chancellor of the New York State Board of Regents
Laurence Tisch (1923–2003), brother of Preston Robert Tisch; part owner of Loews Corporation
Preston Robert Tisch (1926–2005), brother of Laurence Tisch; part owner of Loews Corporation
Steve Tisch (born 1949), son of Preston Robert Tisch; chairman of the New York Giants NFL football team
David Tisch (born 1981), grandson of Laurence Tisch; part owner of Loews Corporation

Others
Charles Tisch (1829-1895), American politician
William F. Tisch (1838-1877). American politician
Harry Tisch (1927–1995), German trade-union leader
Cläre Tisch (1907-1941), also known as Kläre Tisch and Klara Tisch, German economist
Lindsay Tisch (born 1947), New Zealand politician

See also
Tish (disambiguation)